Antonela Fortuna (born ) is an Argentine volleyball player, who plays as an outside hitter at Hungarian club Újpesti TE and the Argentina women's national volleyball team. She competed at the 2020 Summer Olympics.

Career 
She participated in the 2017 FIVB Volleyball Women's U23 World Championship, 2017 FIVB Volleyball World Grand Prix, 2018 FIVB Volleyball Women's World Championship, and 2018 FIVB Volleyball Women's Nations League.
 
At club level she played for San Lorenzo de Almagro from 2013 until May 2018.
After participating of 2018 FIVB Volleyball Women's World Championship, she decided to move to Hungary signing for Újpesti TE from NB I Women.

Clubs
  Club Atlético Villa Dora (2012-2013)
  Club Atlético San Lorenzo de Almagro (2013–2018)
  Újpesti TE (2019–)

International career

National Team

Youth teams

References

External links 

 FIVB profile
 http://www.somosvoley.com/notas/tag/antonela-fortuna/

1995 births
Living people
Argentine women's volleyball players
Pan American Games medalists in volleyball
Pan American Games bronze medalists for Argentina
Volleyball players at the 2019 Pan American Games
Medalists at the 2019 Pan American Games
Volleyball players at the 2020 Summer Olympics
Olympic volleyball players of Argentina
Sportspeople from Santa Fe Province